Ann or Anne Simpson may refer to:

Ann Marie Simpson
Anne Simpson, Canadian poet
Ann Simpson, character played by Robin Givens

See also